PPSC may refer to:

Pikes Peak State College
Public Prosecution Service of Canada
Punjab Public Service Commission (India)
Punjab Public Service Commission (Pakistan)